Jim Clapton (27 February 1927 – 13 May 2011) was a former Australian rules footballer who played with Carlton in the Victorian Football League (VFL).

Notes

External links 

Jim Clapton's profile at Blueseum

1927 births
2011 deaths
Carlton Football Club players
Australian rules footballers from Victoria (Australia)